Since 1970, the South Australian House of Assembly — the lower house of the Parliament of South Australia — has consisted of 47 single-member electoral districts consisting of approximately the same number of enrolled voters. The district boundaries are regulated by the State Electoral Office, according to the requirements of the South Australian Constitution and are subject to mandatory redistributions by the South Australian Electoral Districts Boundaries Commission in order to respond to changing demographics.

Boundary adjustments
Electoral boundaries are adjusted after each election. The number of electors in each district must be within 10% of the average at the time of the redistribution order. Other issues that may be  considered include economic, social and regional communities of interest. From 1990 to 2018, it was also a requirement that each redistribution attempt to ensure that the party that obtains 50% or more of the overall vote at a general election would be able to form a government; this requirement has since been repealed.

While South Australia's total population exceeds 1.7 million, Adelaide's population exceeds 1.3 million − uniquely highly centralised, over 75% of the state's population resides in the metropolitan area and has 72% of seats (34 of 47) alongside a lack of comparatively sized rural population centres, therefore the metropolitan area is crucial in deciding election outcomes. At the 2014 election for example, although the statewide two-party vote (2PP) was 47.0% Labor vs. 53.0% Liberal, the metropolitan area recorded a 2PP of 51.5% Labor v 48.5% Liberal.

List of the current 47 electoral districts

 Adelaide
 Badcoe
 Black
 Bragg
 Chaffey
 Cheltenham
 Colton
 Croydon
 Davenport
 Dunstan
 Elder
 Elizabeth
 Enfield
 Finniss
 Flinders
 Florey
 Frome
 Gibson
 Giles
 Hammond
 Hartley
 Heysen
 Hurtle Vale
 Kaurna
 Kavel
 King
 Lee
 Light
 MacKillop
 Mawson
 Morialta
 Morphett
 Mount Gambier
 Narungga
 Newland
 Playford
 Port Adelaide
 Ramsay
 Reynell
 Schubert
 Stuart
 Taylor
 Torrens
 Unley
 Waite
 West Torrens
 Wright

Maps

Numbers of electorates and members
Since 1938, the South Australian House of Assembly has had single-member electoral districts. From 1938 to 1968 there were 39 districts. Since 1970 there have been 47 electoral districts. From 1857 to 1933, the number of districts varied between 12 (1912–1915) and 27 (1890–1901). Each district returned from 1-6 members.

Electoral districts
This table gives the number of members returned by each electoral district at each election.

Abolished electoral districts
These electoral districts no longer exist:

 Albert
 Albert Park
 Alexandra
 Angas
 Ashford
 Ascot Park
 Barossa
 Baudin
 Briggs
 Bright
 Brighton
 Burnside
 Burra
 Burra Burra
 City of Adelaide
 Coles
 Custance
 East Adelaide
 East Torrens
 Edwardstown
 Encounter Bay
 Eyre
 Fisher
 Gawler
 Gilles
 Gladstone
 Glenelg
 Goodwood
 Gordon
 Gouger
 Goyder
 Gumeracha
 Hanson
 Hart
 Hayward
 Henley Beach
 Hindmarsh
 Little Para
 Mallee
 Millicent
 Mitcham
 Mitchell
 Mount Barker
 Murray
 Murray-Mallee
 Napier
 Newcastle
 Noarlunga
 North Adelaide
 Northern Territory
 Norwood
 Onkaparinga
 Peake
 Pirie
 Port Pirie
 Price
 Prospect
 Ridley
 Rocky River
 Ross Smith
 Salisbury
 Semaphore
 Spence
 Stanley
 Stirling
 Sturt
 Tea Tree Gully
 The Burra
 The Burra and Clare
 The Murray
 Thebarton
 Todd
 Victoria
 Victoria and Albert
 Wallaroo
 Walsh
 West Adelaide
 Whyalla
 Wooroora
 Yatala
 Yorke Peninsula
 Young

See also
Members of the South Australian House of Assembly
Divisions of the Australian House of Representatives

Notes
 Metropolitan 2PP correctly calculated by adding raw metro 2PP vote numbers from the 34 metro seats, both Labor and Liberal, then dividing Labor's raw metro 2PP vote from the total, which revealed a Labor metropolitan 2PP of 51.54%.

References

External links
State Electoral Office
Maps of South Australian Electoral Districts
Statistical Record of the Legislature 1836–2007, Parliament of SA, www.parliament.sa.gov.au
Former Members of the Parliament of South Australia